Tahira Mazhar Ali (née Hayat) (5 January 1924 – 23 March 2015) was a Pakistani women's rights campaigner and a political activist, and mentor to Benazir Bhutto. Her children include British Pakistani political activist Tariq Ali, Tauseef Hyat, and Australian journalist Mahir Ali.

Early life
She was born on 5 January 1924 in Lahore, British India to Sikandar Hayat Khan (1892 – 1942), a politician and former Chief Minister of Punjab, during the British Raj. She was the younger sister of Sardar Shaukat Hayat Khan (1915 – 1998) and Begum Mahmooda Salim Khan (1913 – 2007).

Ali finished her basic education at Queen Mary School in Lahore. She married at the age of 17 to her cousin, Mazhar Ali Khan (1917 – 1993) who was a journalist and editor of the Pakistan Times newspaper who had socialist leanings.

Career
She was one of the founding members of the Communist Party of Pakistan (CPP) and with her husband was also part of the Progressive Papers Ltd (PPL).

Ali was jailed for vigorously opposing General Muhammad Zia-ul-Haq's dictatorship. She was the first person in Pakistan to pair the fight for workers' rights with the fight for women's rights, resisting Zia's assault on the rights of women. Although she was born in an affluent family, she remained an activist for labour and women's rights for over 60 years. In 1950, she was one of the founders of the Democratic Women's Association (DWA), considered the country's first independent women's rights organisation. For the first time in Pakistan, International Women's Day was observed under her leadership where it was openly demanded that women be given equal status and rights. In 1971, she was amongst a small group of people who protested against the war in East Pakistan (now Bangladesh).

In her later years, before she suffered a series of debilitating strokes that left her partially paralysed, she served as a mentor to many prominent Pakistani women.

Death and legacy
Ali died on 23 March 2015 in Lahore. Veteran Pakistani journalist and human rights activist I. A. Rehman paid tribute to her in the Dawn newspaper, saying that she was "a true activist" and mentioning her work for women's rights and peace-making efforts between India and Pakistan.

Further reading

References

1924 births
2015 deaths
Hayat Khattar family
Pakistani women's rights activists
Pakistani human rights activists
Pakistani political people